Beaver tail or Beavertail may refer to:

 The tail of a beaver
 Beaver tail (pastry), a fried dough food
 BeaverTails, a Canadian restaurant chain specializing in beaver tail pastries 
 Opuntia basilaris, beavertail cactus or beavertail pricklypear
 Calochortus coeruleus, beavertail grass
 Beavertail State Park, in Rhode Island, U.S.
 Beavertail Hill State Park, in Montana, U.S.
 Beavertail, a type of flatbed truck tow truck
 Beaver Tail (railcar), built by the Chicago, Milwaukee, St. Paul and Pacific Railroad 1934–1938
 Beaver-tail, an observation car on The Coronation British passenger train, from 1937
 Polish plait, a hairstyle
 Beaver-tail Liver

See also